Ketty Gilsoul-Hoppe (1868–1939) was a Belgian painter who mostly worked in watercolors.

Gilsoul-Hoppe was born in Düsseldorf as the daughter of the engraver Edouard Hoppe. She trained in Bisschoffsheim school in Brussels where in 1894 she married the painter Victor Gilsoul.

She is known for interiors, landscapes and cityscapes, and her painting Interior hallway was included in the 1905 book Women Painters of the World.

Gallery

Galerie Lyceum
She began a Brussels gallery in 1911 together with Berthe Art and some friends. The gallery was called the Galerie Lyceum. Other founding members were Alice Ronner, Emma Ronner, Anna Boch, Louise Danse, Marie Danse, and Juliette Wytsman.

References

External links

Ketty Gilsoul-Hoppe on artnet

1868 births
1939 deaths
Artists from Brussels
Belgian women painters
19th-century Belgian painters
20th-century Belgian painters
19th-century Belgian women artists
20th-century Belgian women artists